There is more than one place in Australia called Brighton.

 Brighton, Queensland, a suburb of Brisbane
 Brighton, South Australia, a coastal suburb of Adelaide
 Brighton, Tasmania
 Brighton, Victoria, a suburb of Melbourne
 Brighton, Western Australia, a suburb of Perth
 Brighton-Le-Sands, New South Wales, a suburb of Sydney

See also
Brighton (disambiguation)